Evans is a census-designated place (CDP) in Columbia County, Georgia, United States. It is a suburb of Augusta and is part of the Augusta metropolitan area. The population was 29,011 at the 2010 census, up from 17,727 at the 2000 census.

Evans County is named after General Clement A. Evans, however according to an interview with his son, Lawton B. Evans, in the Augusta Chronicle, the town of Evans was not named after his father, but rather after an unrelated family by the same last name.  Evans is the de facto county seat of Columbia County, although Appling still holds the de jure designation. The Columbia County Government Center, the Government Complex Addition, and the Columbia County Courthouse Annex are all located in Evans.

Geography
Evans is located in eastern Columbia County, bordered to the northeast by the Savannah River, which forms the South Carolina state line. To the southeast is the town of Martinez.

The original community of Evans is centered on North Belair Road (Georgia State Route 383 (SR 383)) southwest of Washington Road (SR 104). The community extends west from this point to Gibbs Road and Crawford Creek and south as far as Columbia Road (SR 232), but most of the settled area is north of Washington Road and Evans to Locks Road, extending west as far as Little Kiokee Creek and east to Stevens Creek Dam on the Savannah River.

Demographics

2020 census

As of the 2020 United States census, there were 34,536 people, 11,171 households, and 8,897 families residing in the CDP.

2010 census
As of the census of 2010, there were 29,011 people, 6,319 households, and 4,973 families residing in the CDP. The population density was 1,784.1 people per . There were 6,632 housing units at an average density of 667.5 per . The racial makeup of the CDP was 84.61% White, 10.22% African American, 0.25% Native American, 2.69% Asian, 0.05% Pacific Islander, 0.67% from other races, and 1.53% from two or more races. Hispanic or Latino of any race were 2.23% of the population.

There were 6,319 households, out of which 41.8% had children under the age of 18 living with them, 65.9% were married couples living together, 10.0% had a female householder with no husband present, and 21.3% were non-families. 18.5% of all households were made up of individuals, and 8.1% had someone living alone who was 65 years of age or older. The average household size was 2.75 and the average family size was 3.15.

In the CDP, the population was spread out, with 28.4% under the age of 18, 6.9% from 18 to 24, 30.5% from 25 to 44, 23.4% from 45 to 64, and 10.8% who were 65 years of age or older. The median age was 36 years. For every 100 females there were 92.3 males. For every 100 females age 18 and over, there were 86.9 males.

The median income for a household in the CDP was $66,200, and the median income for a family was $76,128. Males had a median income of $49,863 versus $30,002 for females. The per capita income for the CDP was $22,280. About 2.9% of families and 3.7% of the population were below the poverty line, including 2.7% of those under age 18 and 8.7% of those age 65 or over.

Parks and recreation
The Euchee Creek Greenway is under construction.

Education
Evans is served by the Columbia County Public School System.

Elementary schools
Eight public elementary schools serve Evans: Blue Ridge Elementary, Brookwood Elementary, Evans Elementary, Greenbrier Elementary, Lewiston Elementary, Martinez Elementary, North Columbia Elementary, River Ridge Elementary, Parkway Elementary, Riverside Elementary, Stevens Creek Elementary, and South Columbia Elementary.

Middle schools
Four public middle schools serve Evans: Evans Middle School, Greenbrier Middle School, Lakeside Middle School, and Riverside Middle School.

High schools
Three public high schools serve Evans: Evans High School, Greenbrier High School, Lakeside High School

Infrastructure
Major highways include:

Notable people 
 Ben Hayslip

See also

Central Savannah River Area

References

Census-designated places in Columbia County, Georgia
Augusta metropolitan area